The South Korea national under-20 football team (recognized as Korea Republic by FIFA) represents South Korea in international youth football competitions and also can be managed as under-18 or under-19 team if necessary. South Korean under-20 team won twelve AFC U-20 Asian Cup (AFC Youth Championship) titles and reached the FIFA U-20 World Cup final once, both are the most successful results among Asian teams.

History

Red Fury (1983)

Korean unified team (1991)

Recent results and fixtures

The following is a list of match results in the last 12 months, as well as any future matches that have been scheduled.

2022

2023

Coaching staff

Current personnel

Players

Current squad
The following under-20 players were called-up for the 2023 AFC U-20 Asian Cup, held on March 2023.

Competitive record

FIFA U-20 World Cup

AFC U-20 Asian Cup

See also

 Football in South Korea
 Korea Football Association
 South Korea national football team
 South Korea national football B team
 South Korea national under-23 football team
 South Korea national under-17 football team
 South Korea women's national under-20 football team

References

External links
 Official website 

 
Korea Republic
Youth football in South Korea
Football